Sir Donald Gordon (24 June 1930 – 21 November 2019) was a South African - British businessman and philanthropist. He founded Liberty Life Association of Africa in 1957 and Liberty International.

Career

Educated at King Edward VII School in Johannesburg, and then enrolled at the University of the Witwatersrand, Johannesburg where he obtained a BCom degree in Accounting. Thereafter,  he completed  his articles to be a Chartered Accountant at the firm Kessel Feinstein (now Grant Thornton).

He founded the Liberty Life Association of Africa in 1957 out of which he formed Transatlantic Insurance Holdings, now Liberty International, in 1980.

He was behind the development of Sandton City, one of the most successful shopping centres in the world.

Gordon was a director of the Guardian Royal Exchange Group for 24 years and chaired their South African subsidiary, Guardian National Insurance Company.

Other interests

The Gordon Institute of Business Science (GIBS) in Johannesburg, South Africa was established in January 2000 following a substantial contribution by Donald Gordon and a major investment by the University of Pretoria.

In 2004, Gordon gave the Royal Opera House and Wales Millennium Centre a collective donation of £20 million payable over five years. This is believed to be one of the largest single private donations ever made to the arts in the UK. Sir Donald has had the Grand Tier at the Royal Opera House as well as the main auditorium of the Wales Millennium Centre named after him.

Awards and recognition

At the 2000 Entrepreneur of the Year Awards in London, Gordon received the "Entrepreneur of the Year Special Award for Lifetime Achievement". He received an honorary doctorate of economic science from the University of the Witwatersrand and an honorary doctorate in commerce from the University of Pretoria. In 1968, he was named "Businessman of the Year" by the South African Sunday Times. In 1999, he was named as "The Achiever of the Century in South African Financial Services" by South African Financial Mail.

In 2005 Birthday Honours List, he was awarded a knighthood in recognition of his services to arts and business.

References

External links
 

1930 births
Naturalised citizens of the United Kingdom
South African businesspeople
South African Knights Bachelor
South African philanthropists
Alumni of King Edward VII School (Johannesburg)
Gordon Institute of Business Science
Businesspeople awarded knighthoods
2019 deaths
South African emigrants to the United Kingdom
20th-century philanthropists